Jirisan National Park is a national park in South Korea, located on the boundaries of Jeollanam-do, Jeollabuk-do, and Gyeongsangnam-do. It is also located bordering the towns of Namwon, Gurye, and Hamyang.  Jirisan was the first park to be designated as a national park in South Korea, in 1967. It is also the largest terrestrial national park in the country with an emphasis on biodiversity conservation, a well-known conservation programme on the Asiatic black bear and a pioneering restoration programme on damaged areas by overuse.

References

External links

The park's page on Korea National Park Service's website
Hadong-gun's Jirisan page 
Korea Map (Towns)
Tour2Korea
Korean Tourism Prof. David A. Mason's 70 pages on Jiri-san

Parks in North Jeolla Province
Parks in South Jeolla Province
Parks in South Gyeongsang Province
National parks of South Korea
Protected areas established in 1967